The Tip-Off is a 1931 American pre-Code comedy film directed by Albert S. Rogell, written by Earl Baldwin, and starring Eddie Quillan, Robert Armstrong, Ginger Rogers, Joan Peers and Ralf Harolde. The film was released on October 16, 1931, by RKO Pictures.

Plot
Young Tommy Jordan (Eddie Quillan) is sent for a repair job. When he arrives at the address he was told, two guys are waiting for him on the street, bringing him somewhere else - without letting him see where - to repair a radio. He jokes about "must be a hide-out, that I should not know where I am", for which he earns a "you're a smart guy".
When left in the apartment doing his job, he follows a wire and ends up in the bedroom, lying on the floor under the bed.  At this point, the telephone rings and a woman comes out of the bathroom and answers.  He is trapped under the bed and can only see her legs. 
When the lady has finished her conversation, they have to talk and he is told that his great idol Kayo McClure (Robert Armstrong (actor)) a fighter lives in that apartment. She herself is "famous" Babyface (Ginger Rogers) the woman of McClure. 
When McClure comes back home, Tommy manages to hide and when Gang leader Nick Vatelli (Ralf Harolde) appears in McClure's apartment with his men threatening him, Tommy acts as Policeofficers through the radio-microphone, so that they leave the flat. McClure is forever thankful to Tommy and he offers him to help him whenever he needs it. McClure hands him out a ticket to a ball.
When he gets to the ball there is Baby-Face eager to dance with him. To avoid being mixed up too much with her attracting jealousy of McClure he grabs another girl, that was handy to him, to dance. But this girl is even worse, as she is the fiancé of Nick, Edna Moreno (Joan Peers). Tommy is very fond of her and when Nick appears he finally takes Edna with him to McClure, to hide for a night. The next day Babyface argues with McClure about hiding the kids, threatening to leave him. Edna leaves the apartment without saying anything.
Tommy finds out where she is, and with the help of McClure he saves her from marrying Nick.  As the movie ends, Tommy and Edna get married.

Cast 
Eddie Quillan as Thomas 'Tommy' Jordan
Robert Armstrong as Kayo McClure
Ginger Rogers as Baby Face
Joan Peers as Edna Moreno
Ralf Harolde as Nick Vatelli
Mike Donlin as Swanky Jones
Ernie Adams as Slug McGee
Charles Sellon as Pop Jackson
Helen Ainsworth as Miss Ethel Waddums 
Luis Alberni as Scarno - Roadhouse Manager (uncredited)
Harry Bowen as Dude - Vatelli Henchman (uncredited)
Frank Darien as Edna's Uncle (uncredited)
Dorothy Granger as Hatcheck Girl (uncredited)
Pat Harmon	 as Vatelli Henchman (uncredited)
Jack Herrick as Jack - Kayo's Sparring Partner (uncredited)
Ethan Laidlaw as Henchman (uncredited)
Charles Sullivan as Chuck - Bouncer at Scarno's (uncredited)
Harry Wilson as Hood at Scarno's (uncredited)

References

External links
 

1931 films
American black-and-white films
1930s English-language films
RKO Pictures films
Films directed by Albert S. Rogell
American comedy films
1931 comedy films
Films scored by Arthur Lange
1930s American films